Michael Eitan (born 6 March 1944) is an Israeli politician. A member of the Knesset for Likud from 1984 until 2013, he also served as Minister of Science & Technology between July 1997 and July 1998 and Minister of Improvement of Government Services from 2009 until 2013.

Biography
Michael "Miki" Eitan was born in Tel Aviv during the Mandate era. He studied law at Tel Aviv University. He joined the Herut party, and was a chairman of its youth guard before becoming a member of the party's central committee and chairman of its Ramat Gan branch.

Eitan was elected to the Knesset on the Likud list (within which Herut was a faction until 1988) in 1984, and was re-elected in 1988, 1992 and 1996, becoming coalition chairman after the latter election, having been co-ordinator of the opposition between 1992 and 1996. In 1997, Eitan was co-author of the Beilin-Eitan Agreement presented to Abu Mazen. In July 1997 he was appointed Minister of Science & Technology, but was replaced by Silvan Shalom in July the following year. He then served as a Deputy Minister in the Prime Minister's Office until the 1999 elections. During the Knesset term he chaired its sub-committee on communication and information and helped establish the Knesset's website.

Although he retained his seat in the 1999 elections, they were won by the Labor Party-led One Israel alliance and Eitan lost his place in the cabinet. He was re-elected in 2003, 2006 and 2009, after which he briefly served as temporary Knesset speaker due to him being the longest-serving MK alongside Binyamin Ben-Eliezer. He was later appointed Minister of Improvement of Government Services. He did not contest the 2013 elections.

In December 2016 Eitan was diagnosed with Parkinson's disease, which by 2021 had made him unable to function alone. In February 2021 he underwent a deep brain stimulation procedure at Hadassah Medical Center in Jerusalem, which greatly improved his condition and enabled him to lead a normal life again.

Eitan is a resident of the town of Kokhav Ya'ir, and was a founder and director of the settlement project.

References

External links
Eitan's website 

1944 births
Deputy ministers of Israel
Ministers of Science of Israel
Jews in Mandatory Palestine
Likud politicians
Living people
Members of the 11th Knesset (1984–1988)
Members of the 12th Knesset (1988–1992)
Members of the 13th Knesset (1992–1996)
Members of the 14th Knesset (1996–1999)
Members of the 15th Knesset (1999–2003)
Members of the 16th Knesset (2003–2006)
Members of the 17th Knesset (2006–2009)
Members of the 18th Knesset (2009–2013)
People from Tel Aviv
Speakers of the Knesset
Tel Aviv University alumni